The Scandinavian Masters is an annual golf tournament on the European Tour played in Sweden. In 2020 the tournament became co-sanctioned with the Ladies European Tour and rebranded as the Scandinavian Mixed, in which both male and female golfers compete.

History
The tournament had its origins in the Volvo Open and the Scandinavian Enterprise Open, which, in 1973, became the first Swedish stop on the European Tour schedule. In 1991, the SEO merged with the PLM Open, with the resultant tournament being called the Scandinavian Masters.

Until 2011, the tournament was played at the end of July or the beginning of August each year. For 2012, it moved to the first weekend in June, and was played from Wednesday to Saturday to allow players more time to travel to the following week's U.S. Open. From 2013 to 2017 it was played in late May/early June, two weeks before the U.S. Open, but in 2018 it was played in August.

In 2019 Lagardère Group passed management of the tournament on to the European Tour, which renamed it Scandinavian Invitation.

Mixed event
In 2020 the European Tour and Ladies European Tour created the Scandinavian Mixed hosted by Henrik and Annika, for the first time bringing 78 men and 78 women together to compete in the same tournament for the same prize money, but playing from different tees. Official World Golf Ranking points are offered for both tours, along with points toward the European Tour's and LET's respective season-long competitions, as well as Ryder Cup and Solheim Cup points, if applicable, which require the results to be divided between men and women. 

The first event was originally scheduled to take place in June 2020, however it was cancelled like many other events at the time, due to the COVID-19 pandemic.

The event did return in June 2021, with Jonathan Caldwell winning the inaugural mixed event; shooting a final-round 64 to beat Adrián Otaegui by one shot. Alice Hewson was the highest placed female; finishing in third place.

The 2022 event created history as Linn Grant became the first woman to win on the European Tour. She won by nine strokes ahead of Henrik Stenson and Marc Warren. The next best-placed female was Gabriella Cowley, 14 strokes behind Grant.

Venues
The following venues have been used since the founding of the Scandinavian Masters in 1991.

Winners

See also
List of sporting events in Sweden

Notes

References

External links

Coverage on the European Tour's official site

European Tour events
Ladies European Tour events
Golf tournaments in Sweden
Sport in Gothenburg
Mixed sports competitions
Recurring sporting events established in 1991